Kaalam Maari Pochu is a 1956 Indian Tamil-language film starring Gemini Ganesan and Anjali Devi. It is a remake of the Telugu film Rojulu Marayi.

Plot 

The story focuses social and economic issues faced by farmers in rural areas and intertwined with a love story. A money lender in the village surreptitiously grabs the lands of poor farmers after lending them money. The un-educated poor farmers lose their lands due to ignorance. Later, the son of a poor farmer, who is educated, bares the truth about the money lender and in the presence of the District Collector gives back the lands to the owners.

Cast 
Gemini Ganesan
Anjali Devi
T. S. Balaiah
Girija
K. A. Thangavelu
M. R. Santhanalakshmi
T. S. Durairaj
S. V. Subbaiah
T. K. Balachandran
Waheeda Rehman (Dance)

Production 
The film was originally produced in Telugu with the title Rojulu Marayi by C. V. R. Prasath and directed by Tapi Chanakya. The Tamil film was produced with entirely new cast. Dialogues and songs were written originally for the Tamil version. The dialogues were written by Muhavai Rajamanickam who was a freedom fighter and (at that time) was the leader of the then united Communist Party of India. He was also a famous writer in Tamil Language. The film was shot entirely on rural locations with real-life farmers partaking.

Soundtrack 
Music was composed by Master Venu and lyrics by Muhavai Rajamanickam.

Controversy 
The song "Kallam Kabadam Theriyadhavane" became very popular. Those days, the songs were recorded for gramophone records and released well before the films are released. Accordingly, this song also was released early. There was another film Madurai Veeran released one month before Kaalam Maari Pochu. In Madurai Veeran, there is a song "Summa Kidantha Sothukku Kashtam" that had the same tune as "Kallam Kabadam Theriyadhavane" song. A. V. Meiyappan was the distributor of Kaalam Maari Pochu. He thought the Madurai Veeran song will jeopardise the success of his film. He went as far as advertising "Dont be misled by the so-called 'Veerans' of the films!". Then he filed a case against the producer of Madurai Veeran, Lena Chettiar that he has stolen the tune of his film song. The lawyer V. L. Ethiraj appeared for Chettiar. The Judge observed that the tune of the songs are based on folklore music and no one can claim a right of ownership to such folklore music. The case was dismissed.

Reception 
The Hindu wrote, "Well acted, it develops its central theme – the possibility of the kisan liberating himself from the dominant influence of the rich landholder and promoting his own and the country's interest through collective effort – with considerable effect". The Indian Express wrote, "S. V. Subbiah steals the sow with a masterly portrayal of the poor, humble, old-world peasant who is a great stickler to properties".

References

External links 
 

1950s Tamil-language films
1956 films
Films directed by Tapi Chanakya
Indian black-and-white films
Indian drama films
Tamil remakes of Telugu films
Films scored by Master Venu
1956 drama films